HNLMS Sumatra may refer to following ships of the Royal Netherlands Navy:
 , a Java-class frigate wrecked in 1830
 , a small protected cruiser
 , a 

Royal Netherlands Navy ship names